Ian Ashbee (born 6 September 1976) is an English former footballer who retired in 2012 having previously played for Preston North End, Derby County, Cambridge United and Hull City, and in Iceland, on loan to Íþróttafélag Reykjavíkur. He is currently Assistant Manager at Bridlington Town.

Career

Derby County
Ashbee began his career at Derby County in 1994. He stayed at the Rams for two seasons, but struggled to make an impact and after a loan spell, he was eventually sold to Cambridge United in 1996.

Cambridge United
Ashbee was one of Cambridge United's longest-serving players at the time. He made his debut in a 1–0 win at Torquay. It was here that Ashbee made his name as he scored 11 goals in over 200 games for The U's.

Hull City
Purchased by manager Jan Mølby in June 2002 in the Third Division he suffered a nightmare start to his Hull career as he was sent off on his debut. This was, however, due to his no-nonsense approach on the pitch and he soon became a firm favourite with Tigers fans and management alike, with both Mølby and Peter Taylor making him captain.

The goal he scored against Yeovil Town was the goal that promoted Hull to League One and he was also instrumental in Hull's successful promotion campaign to the Football League Championship in the following season.

Ashbee was, however, cursed by an old injury in the subsequent Championship campaign, being diagnosed with an osteochondral defect, a degenerative bone condition in his femur. He underwent surgery that involved drilling fourteen holes in the bone to stimulate re-growth. He was warned by his doctor that this injury threatened not just his career, but his ability to even walk. Ashbee was on crutches for four months and was ruled out for the majority of the 2005–06 season, nevertheless he remained a favourite amongst many Tigers fans, receiving a standing ovation at the last game of the season against Watford despite being sidelined.

He was also retained as captain by Hull's next manager, Phil Parkinson, and his replacement, Phil Brown. But with a poor team performance in their second season in the Championship, finishing just one place outside the relegation zone, Ashbee as captain received a large share of fans' criticisms that were aimed at the team, despite the outgoing chairman Adam Pearson suggesting him as a potential Player of the Season.

The 2007–08 season saw vastly improved performances from the team as a whole, culminating in the club reaching its first ever Wembley Stadium final, taking on Bristol City for a place in the Premier League, a game which they won 1–0. This meant that Ashbee captained Hull to promotion from the bottom division of the Football League to the top. Andy Dawson, Boaz Myhill and Ryan France are the other players to have helped take Hull up through the four divisions. On 16 August 2008 Ashbee was captain of the Hull side that won its first ever top-flight game 2–1 against Fulham, completing an achievement thought to be unique in English football: captaining the same team in all four divisions of the Football League, bottom to top.

Towards the end of the 2008–09 season, in a fixture against Aston Villa on 4 May 2009, Ashbee suffered another career-threatening injury, rupturing a posterior cruciate ligament in his knee. It was initially thought that he would return to action in the Autumn, however on 18 August it was reported that Ashbee required further surgery on the knee and would likely miss the entire 2009–10 season.

Upon his return in the first game of the 2010–11 season, Ashbee scored the second goal in Hull 's 2–0 victory over Swansea City.

Preston North End
In January 2011, Ashbee signed for Preston North End, managed by former Hull manager Phil Brown, after handing in a transfer request to then Hull City manager Nigel Pearson. Ashbee was offered a 1-year contract extension at Hull, but wanted to sign a 2-year contract, which Preston offered him. He went on to make 19 appearances for Preston during the season, but could not prevent his club from being relegated. Ashbee was named club captain of Preston in June 2011.

On 2 February 2012, Preston and Ashbee agreed to end his contract. During that season, at the age of 35, he had struggled through a knee injury that restricted him to only seven starts and four substitute appearances.

Retirement
Ashbee stated on his Twitter page later in 2012 that he had retired from professional football at the age of 36.

On 13 January 2015, he came out of retirement by signing for a short time with Humber Premier League side Hull United. He subsequently became chairman in June 2015, combining the role with his assistant manager duties. He left the club along with Curtis Woodhouse in 2016

Management
On 20 September 2016 Ian Ashbee was announced as the assistant manager to Curtis Woodhouse at Bridlington Town.

Jewellery
In 2013 Ian Ashbee began working for Blowers Jewellers as Director of Sports Clients.

Honours
Third Division (IV): Runner-up 1999, 2004
Football League Trophy: Runner-up 2002
Football League One (III): Runner-up 2005
Football League Championship (II): Play-offs 2008

References

External links
Ian Ashbee profile at Preston North End F.C.

England profile at TheFA

1976 births
Living people
Footballers from Birmingham, West Midlands
English footballers
English expatriate footballers
England youth international footballers
Association football midfielders
Derby County F.C. players
ÍR men's football players
Cambridge United F.C. players
Hull City A.F.C. players
Preston North End F.C. players
Hull United A.F.C. players
Premier League players
English Football League players
Expatriate footballers in Iceland
English expatriate sportspeople in Iceland